Dwight Vreeland Swain (November 17, 1915 – February 24, 1992), born in Rochester, Michigan, was an American author, screenwriter and teacher. Swain was a member of the Oklahoma Writers Hall of Fame.

Career
His first published story was "Henry Horn's Super Solvent", which appeared in Fantastic Adventures in 1941.  He contributed stories of the genres of science fiction, mystery, Western, and action adventure to a variety of magazines of the pulp variety.  His first published book was The Transposed Man (1955), which appeared as Ace Double D-113, bound dos-à-dos with J.T. McIntosh's One In Three Hundred. He published several more novels, including The Horde From Infinity, vended as another Ace Double with The Day The Earth Froze by Gerald Hatch. During the 1960s, he scripted a motion picture, Stark Fear, featuring Keith Toby and Beverly Garland.

Teaching
He joined the staff of the successful Professional Writing Program of the University of Oklahoma, training writers of commercial fiction and movies.  He pioneered scripting documentaries and educational/instructional movies using dramatic techniques, rather than the previously common talking heads.

He later published non-fiction books about writing, including Techniques of the Selling Writer; Film Scriptwriting; Creating Characters: How to Build Story People; and Scripting for Video and Audiovisual Media, and was in demand as a speaker at writers' conferences throughout the USA and Mexico.

References

External links
 
 
 
 

1915 births
1992 deaths
American science fiction writers
Pulp fiction writers
University of Oklahoma faculty
Novelists from Oklahoma
Writers of books about writing fiction
20th-century American novelists
American male novelists
American male short story writers
20th-century American short story writers
20th-century American male writers
Screenwriting instructors
20th-century screenwriters